The Dnieper or Dnipro is one of the major transboundary rivers of Europe, rising in the Valdai Hills near Smolensk, Russia, before flowing through Belarus and Ukraine to the Black Sea. It is the longest river of Ukraine and Belarus and the fourth-longest river in Europe, after the Volga, Danube, and Ural rivers.

In antiquity, the river was part of the Amber Road trade routes. During the Ruin in the later 17th century, the area was contested between the Polish–Lithuanian Commonwealth and Russia, dividing Ukraine into areas described by its right and left banks. During the Soviet period, the river became noted for its major hydroelectric dams and large reservoirs. The 1986 Chernobyl disaster occurred on the Pripyat, just upstream from tributary's confluence with the Dnieper. The Dnieper is an important navigable waterway for the economy of Ukraine and is connected by the Dnieper–Bug Canal to other waterways in Europe. During the 2022 Russian invasion of Ukraine, certain segments of the river are part of the defensive lines between territory controlled by Russians and Ukrainians.

Names

In English, "Dnieper" derives from the Russian pronunciation and "Dnipro" from the Ukrainian.

The name varies slightly in the local Slavic languages of the three countries through which it flows:
 ; formerly spelled 
These names are all cognate, deriving from Old East Slavic  (Dŭněprŭ). The origin of this name is disputed but generally derived from either Sarmatian * ("Farther River") in parallel with the Dniester ("Nearer River") or from Scythian * ("Deep River") in reference to its lack of fords, from which was also derived the Late Antique name of the river, .

the Graeco-Roman name of the river, .
From  was derived the river's poetic Latin name, 
the Huns' name for the river, from Scythian , "Broad."

During the period of Old Great Bulgaria, it was known as Buri-Chai and, under the Kievan Rus' it was known as Славу́тич (Slavútytch), a name still used poetically in Ukrainian due to the influence of the Old East Slavic epic The Tale of Igor's Campaign and its modern adaptations on Ukrainian literature. This usage also lent its name to the city of Slavutych, founded in the wake of the Chernobyl disaster in 1986 to house displaced workers. The Kipchak Turks called it the Uzeu, the Crimean Tatars the Özü, and modern Turks the Özü or Özi.

Geography

For  of its length, it serves as the border between Belarus and Ukraine. Its estuary, or liman, used to be defended by the strong fortress of Ochakiv.

The southernmost point in Belarus is on the Dnieper to the south of Kamaryn in Brahin Raion.

Tributaries of the Dnieper

The Dnieper has many tributaries (up to 32,000) with 89 being rivers of 100+ km. The main ones are, from its source to its mouth, with left (L) or right (R) bank indicated:

 Vyazma (L)
 Vop (R)
 Khmost (R)
 Myareya (L)
 Drut (R)
 Berezina (R)
 Sozh (L)
 Pripyat (R)
 Teteriv (R)
 Irpin (R)
 Desna (L)
 Stuhna (R)
 Trubizh (L)
 Ros (R)
 Tiasmyn (R)
 Supii (L)
 Sula (L)
 Psyol (L)
 Vorskla (L)
 Oril (L)
 Samara (L)
 Konka (L)
 Bilozerka (L)
 Bazavluk (R)
 Inhulets (R)

Many small direct tributaries also exist, such as, in the Kyiv area, the Syrets (right bank) in the north of the city, the historically significant Lybid (right bank) passing west of the centre, and the Borshahivka (right bank) to the south.

The water resources of the Dnieper basin compose around 80% of the total for all Ukraine.

Rapids

The Dnieper Rapids were part of the trade route from the Varangians to the Greeks, first mentioned in the Kyiv Chronicle. The route was probably established in the late eighth and early ninth centuries and gained significant importance from the tenth until the first third of the eleventh century. On the Dnieper the Varangians had to portage their ships round seven rapids, where they had to be on guard for Pecheneg nomads.

Along this middle flow of the Dnieper, there were 9 major rapids (although some sources cite a fewer number of them), obstructing almost the whole width of the river, about 30 to 40 smaller rapids, obstructing only part of the river, and about 60 islands and islets.

After the Dnieper hydroelectric station was built in 1932, they were inundated by Dnieper Reservoir.

Canals
There are a number of canals connected to the Dnieper:
The Dnieper–Donbas Canal;
The Dnieper–Kryvyi Rih Canal;
The Kakhovka Canal (southeast of the Kherson region);
The Krasnoznamianka Irrigation System in the southwest of the Kherson region;
The North Crimean Canal—will largely solve the water problem of the peninsula, especially in the arid northern and eastern Crimea;
The Inhulets Irrigation System.

Fauna
The river is part of the quagga mussel's native range. The mussel has been accidentally introduced around the world, where it has become an invasive species.

Delta 

The city of Kherson lies near to the Dnieper delta.

Ecology
Nowadays the Dnieper River suffers from anthropogenic influence resulting in numerous emissions of pollutants. The Dnieper is close to the Prydniprovsky Chemical Plant radioactive dumps (near Kamianske) and susceptible to leakage of its radioactive waste. The river is also close to the Chernobyl Nuclear Power Station (Chernobyl Exclusion Zone) which is located next to the mouth of the Pripyat River.

Navigation
Almost  of the river is navigable (to the city of Dorogobuzh). The Dnieper is important for transportation in the economy of Ukraine. Its reservoirs have large ship locks, allowing vessels of up to  access as far as the port of Kyiv, and thus are an important transportation corridor. The river is used by passenger vessels as well. Inland cruises on the rivers Danube and Dnieper have had a growing market in recent decades.

Upstream from Kyiv, the Dnieper receives the water of the Pripyat River. This navigable river connects to the Dnieper-Bug canal, the link with the Bug River. Historically, a connection with the Western European waterways was possible, but a weir without any ship lock near the town of Brest, Belarus, has interrupted this international waterway. Poor political relations between Western Europe and Belarus mean there is little likelihood of reopening this waterway in the near future. River navigation is interrupted each year by freezing and severe winter storms.

Reservoirs and hydroelectric power

From the mouth of the Pripyat River to the Kakhovka Hydroelectric Station, there are six sets of dams and hydroelectric stations, which produce 10% of Ukraine's electricity.

The first constructed was the Dnieper Hydroelectric Station (or DniproHES) near Zaporizhzhia, built between 1927 and 1932 with an output of 558 MW. It was destroyed during World War II, but was rebuilt in 1948 with an output of 750 MW.

Regions and cities

Regions

Cities
Major cities, over 100,000 in population, are in bold script.
Cities and towns located on the Dnieper are listed in order from the river's source (in Russia) to its mouth (in Ukraine):

Arheimar, a capital of the Goths, was located on the Dnieper, according to the Hervarar saga.

In the arts

Literature
The River Dnieper has been a subject of chapter X of a story by Nikolai Gogol A Terrible Vengeance (1831, published in 1832 as a part of the Evenings on a Farm Near Dikanka short stories collection). It is considered as a classical example of description of the nature in Russian literature. The river was also described in the works of Taras Shevchenko.

In the adventure novel The Long Ships (also translated Red Orm), set during the Viking Age, a Scanian chieftain travels to the Dnieper Rapids to retrieve a treasure hidden there by his brother, encountering many difficulties. The novel was very popular in Sweden and is one of few to depict a Viking voyage to eastern Europe.

Visual arts
The River Dnieper has been a subject for artists, great and minor, over the centuries. Major artists with works based on the Dnieper are Arkhip Kuindzhi and Ivan Aivazovsky.

Films
The River Dnieper makes an appearance in the 1964 Hungarian drama film The Sons of the Stone-Hearted Man (based on the novel of the same name by Mór Jókai), where it appears when two characters are leaving Saint Petersburg but get attacked by wolves.

In 1983, the concert program "Song of the Dnieper" from the "Victory Salute" series was released, dedicated to the 40th anniversary of the liberation of the city of Kiev from the German fascist invaders. The program includes songs by Soviet composers, Ukrainian folk songs, and dances performed by the Song and Dance Ensemble of the Kiev Military District led by A. Pustovalov, P. Virsky Ukrainian National Folk Dance Ensemble, Kyiv Bandurist Capella, the Military Band of the Headquarters of the Kiev Military District led by A. Kuzmenko, singers Anatoliy Mokrenko, Lyudmila Zykina, Anatoliy Solovianenko, Dmytro Hnatyuk, Mykola Hnatyuk. Filming on the battlefield, streets and squares of Kiev. Scriptwriter - Victor Meerovsky. Directed by Victor Cherkasov. Operator - Alexander Platonov.

The 2018 film Volcano was filmed at the river in Beryslav, Kherson Oblast.

Music
In 1941, Mark Fradkin wrote "Song of the Dnieper" to the words of Yevgeniy Dolmatovsky.

Image gallery

Popular culture
 The river is one of the symbols of the Ukrainian nation and is mentioned in the national anthem of Ukraine. 
 There are several names that connect the name of the river with Ukraine: Overdnieper Ukraine, Right-bank Ukraine, Left-bank Ukraine, and others. Some of the cities on its banks — Dnipro, Dniprorudne, Kamianka-Dniprovska — are named after the river.
 The Zaporozhian Cossacks lived on the lower Dnieper and their name refers to their location "beyond the rapids".
 The folk metal band Turisas have a song called "The Dnieper Rapids" on their 2007 album The Varangian Way.

See also
 List of rivers of Russia
 List of rivers of Belarus
 List of rivers of Ukraine
 List of crossings of the Dnieper
 Middle Dnieper culture
 Trade route from the Varangians to the Greeks
 2022–23 Dnipro River skirmishes

Notes

References and footnotes

External links

 
 Volodymyr Kubijovyč, Ivan Teslia, Dnieper River at the Encyclopedia of Ukraine
 Site about Dnieper—objects over the river, photos, facts
 Dnieper river charts

 "Комсомольская правда" об угрозах плотины Киевской ГЭС и водохранилища (tr. "Komsomolskaya Pravda" about the threats of the dam of the Kyiv hydroelectric power station and the reservoir")
 "Аргументы и факты" о реальных угрозах дамбы Киевского водохранилища и ГЭС (tr. ""Arguments and Facts" about the real threats of the dam of the Kyiv reservoir and hydroelectric power station") 
 "Известия" о проблематике плотины Киевского водохранилища и ГЭС (tr. ""Izvestia" about the problems of the dam of the Kyiv reservoir and hydroelectric power station")
 Эксперт УНИАН об угрозах дамбы Киевского водохранилища (tr. "UNIAN expert on the threats of the Kyiv reservoir dam")

 
Border rivers
Belarus–Russia border
Belarus–Ukraine border
Ottoman Empire–Russian Empire border
Polish–Lithuanian Commonwealth–Russian Empire border
International rivers of Europe
Ramsar sites in Belarus
Rivers of Belarus
Rivers of Cherkasy Oblast
Rivers of Dnipropetrovsk Oblast
Rivers of Gomel Region
Rivers of Kherson Oblast
Rivers of Kyiv
Rivers of Mogilev Region
Rivers of Poltava Oblast
Rivers of Smolensk Oblast
Rivers of Vitebsk Region
Rivers of Zaporizhzhia Oblast